Juvenal Gomes da Silva (born 5 June 1979, in São Paulo), known as just Juvenal, is a retired  Brazilian footballer.

External links
 CBF 
 
 

1979 births
Living people
Footballers from São Paulo
Brazilian footballers
Association football defenders
Brazilian expatriate footballers
Expatriate footballers in Belarus
Expatriate footballers in Lithuania
São José Esporte Clube players
FC Dinamo Minsk players
FC Neman Grodno players
FC Naftan Novopolotsk players
FC Šiauliai players
Clube Atlético Hermann Aichinger players